Kollappally is a developing town in Kottayam district near Pala Kerala. It is located between two major cities of Kerala, Pala and Thodupuzha, on the Main Eastern Highway (state highway-8). It connects Kottayam to two towns in Idukki district - Pynavu, the headquarters of Idukki district and Thodupuzha, the business centre of Idukki district. The next nearest village is Ullanadu. Kollappally is 180 km away from the state capital, Trivandrum. The Lalam river flows through the heart of the town.

Transport 
 
 The nearest Railway station is Ettumanoor, 23 KM and Kottayam which is around 35 KM.
 The nearest Airport is Cochin International Airport, about 65 km. Trivandrum International Airport is around 190 KM from Kollappally.
 The Main Eastern Highway ( Punalur-Pala-Thodupuzha-Muvattupuzha Road (SH–08) ) connects the town to other major towns.
 Kollappally is 7 Kilometres from Pala and 22 Kilometres from Thodupuzha.
 Pala- Kollappally - Neeloor - Muttom - Thodupuzha Road

Schools

 St Sebastian's Higher Secondary School Kadanad
 Government UP school Anthinad
 St Thomas college Pala
 Alphonsa College Pala
 St Thomas HSS Pala
 Govt HSS Pala
 St. Joseph’s College of Engineering and Technology
 Chavara CMI Public School & Junior College
 St. Vincent English Medium Higher Secondary School Pala
 St. Joseph's English Medium High School, Neeloor
 Bappuji Public School, Elivaly
 Ambika Vidyabhavan Aimcompu
 St. Michael's High School, Pravithanam
 Nirmala Public school, Pizhak
Sanjos Public School, Choondacherry
St. John's High School Kurumannu

Religious places 
 St Joseph's Church anthinad
 St. Augustine's Church - Kadanad
 Sree Mahadeva Temple Anthinad
 Parekkavu devi temple Aimcomp
 Sree Dharma Sastha Temple Kadanad
 SNDP Temple Kollappally
 JW (Jesus Workers) Community Kollappally

References

Villages in Kottayam district